Sir Richard Edmonds Luyt  (8 November 1915 – 12 February 1994) was the colonial Governor of British Guiana in 1964–66. He installed Forbes Burnham of the People's National Congress (PNC) as premier of a coalition government with a small business-oriented conservative party in 1964; however, the People's Progressive Party (PPP) came first in the election. Deadly riots ensued when the PPP was not allowed to form the government. Upon independence in May 1966, Sir Richard was sworn in as Governor-General of Guyana, a position which he held until December the same year.

Having been born and educated in Cape Town, he returned there in 1967 as principal and vice-chancellor of the University of Cape Town, a post which he held until 1980. Because of his actions in British Guiana, his appointment was initially opposed by the student body but he soon won them over. During this period, at the height of the apartheid years in South Africa, academic freedom was under threat and Sir Richard was in the forefront of South African vice-chancellors who fought to protect these freedoms. He also vigorously objected against banning orders and detention without trial of students and staff who protested against apartheid.

Sir Richard was an excellent cricketer and rugby player. He obtained a Rugby Blue at the University of Oxford where he was a Rhodes Scholar and played in three first-class cricket matches for Oxford University Cricket Club.

During World War II Sir Richard fought against the Italians in Ethiopia and was awarded the Distinguished Conduct Medal.

|-

References

LUYT, Sir Richard (Edmonds), Who Was Who, A & C Black, 1920–2016 (online edition, Oxford University Press, 2014)

External links

1915 births
1994 deaths
People from Cape Town
History of Guyana
Governors of British Guiana
Governors-General of Guyana
South African knights
South African Rhodes Scholars
Academic staff of the University of Cape Town
South African Knights Grand Cross of the Order of St Michael and St George
Knights Commander of the Royal Victorian Order
Recipients of the Distinguished Conduct Medal
Oxford University cricketers
Alumni of Trinity College, Oxford
Chief Secretaries of Northern Rhodesia
Members of the Legislative Council of Northern Rhodesia
Vice-Chancellors of the University of Cape Town